Manchurian is a class of Indian Chinese dishes made by  roughly chopping and deep-frying ingredients such as chicken, cauliflower (gobi), prawns, fish, mutton, and paneer, and then sautéeing them in a sauce flavored with soy sauce. Manchurian is the result of the adaptation of Chinese cooking and seasoning techniques to suit Indian tastes. It has become a staple of Indian Chinese cuisine.

History
The word "Manchurian" means native or inhabitant of Manchuria (around northeast China), but the dish is basically a creation of Chinese restaurants in India, and bears little resemblance to traditional Manchu cuisine or Northeastern Chinese cuisine. It is said to have been invented in 1975 by Nelson Wang, a cook at the Cricket Club of India in Mumbai, when a customer asked him to create a new dish, different from what was available on the menu.  Wang described his invention process as starting from the basic ingredients of an Indian dish, namely chopped garlic, ginger, and green chilis, but next, instead of adding garam masala, he put in soy sauce, followed by cornstarch and the chicken itself. A popular vegetarian variant replaces chicken with cauliflower, and is commonly known as gobi manchurian. Other vegetarian variants include mushroom, baby corn, and veggie ball Manchurian.

Variations
There are two different variants of Manchurian, dry or semi dry and with gravy. Both variants are prepared by using common ingredients like corn flour, maida flour, spring onion, bell peppers, soy sauce, chili sauce, minced garlic, ground pepper, etc. and has typical garnish of spring onion. Some recipes call for use of monosodium glutamate (MSG) to increase the taste profile, though there are those who avoid it due to health concerns. Its taste can vary from mildly spicy to hot and fiery based on the recipe and personal preference.

Dry or crispy Manchurian 

The fritters are served comparatively dry, often as a snack or starter with tomato ketchup as dipping sauce. It is popular among alcohol drinkers as a bar snack, and has been described as "an excellent drinking companion to cold beer".

Manchurian with gravy 

The fritters are coated with a thick sauce like spicy gravy curry made of corn flour. It is generally served with varieties of rice dishes like steamed rice, Chinese fried rice, or Sichuan fried rice, as the main course.

See also

 List of deep fried foods
 List of vegetable dishes
 Easy Food Recipe

References

External links 

 how to make gobi manchurian - full video
 Veg Food Recipes

Vegetable dishes
Indian vegetable dishes
Vegetarian dishes of India
Brassica oleracea dishes
Deep fried foods
Indian Chinese cuisine